John St John Frederick (6 January 1846 – 10 September 1907) was an English first-class cricketer who played as a right-handed batsman and a right-arm roundarm fast bowler.

Life and career 
Frederick was a son of Edward Frederick, a British Army officer. He was educated at Eton, where he played for the school in the Eton and Harrow match in 1861, and Christ Church, Oxford. He made his first-class debut for Oxford University in 1864 against the Marylebone Cricket Club. In the 1864 season, he represented Oxford University in five first-class matches, and he was awarded his blue by appearing in the match against Cambridge University, which Oxford won by four wickets; his contribution, however, was just a single run in his two innings.

Frederick also made his debut for Hampshire against Middlesex in the same season. In the return match against Middlesex, he claimed all of his four first-class wickets in Middlesex's first innings with figures of 4/45.

Later in the season Frederick also made his debut for Middlesex, representing the county in a single first-class match against the Marylebone Cricket Club. He made yet another first-class debut in the 1864 season, this time for the Gentlemen of Marylebone Cricket Club against the Gentlemen of Kent.

In 1866 Frederick played for the Marylebone Cricket Club against Surrey. He represented the Marylebone Cricket Club in one further first-class match during that season against the Gentlemen of Kent. In addition, he represented Oxford University in a single first-class match against Southgate and played for Hampshire in a single first-class match against Surrey.

In the 1867 season, Frederick represented Oxford University in four first-class matches, the last of which came against Surrey. In his ten first-class matches for the University, he scored 188 runs at a batting average of 11.05, with a high score of 39.

In 1868, Frederick played for the Gentlemen of Marylebone Cricket Club against Kent. In 1869 he played for Hampshire against the MCC and his final career first-class match was for the MCC against Kent.

Frederick had a military career. In 1876, he is recorded as a lieutenant in the Inniskilling Dragoons and was appointed as aide-de-camp to the commanding officer of the Cavalry Brigade at Aldershot. In reports of MCC meetings in The Times in the 1890s, Frederick, who was on the committee, is identified as "Captain J. St J. Frederick".

Frederick died at Camberley, Surrey on 10 September 1907 after what was described as "a long illness". The death notice records that he was a member of the Junior Carlton Club.

Family
Frederick's nephew Edward Frederick also represented Hampshire in first-class cricket, as well as the Europeans (India).

References

External links
John Frederick at Cricinfo
John Frederick at CricketArchive
Matches and detailed statistics for John Frederick

1846 births
1907 deaths
Cricketers from Greater London
English cricketers
Oxford University cricketers
Hampshire cricketers
Middlesex cricketers
Marylebone Cricket Club cricketers
People educated at Eton College
Alumni of Christ Church, Oxford
6th (Inniskilling) Dragoons officers
Gentlemen of Middlesex cricketers
Gentlemen of Marylebone Cricket Club cricketers